Richard Mazda (born 5 May 1955) is a record producer, writer, musician, actor and director.

Music career

Mazda was one of the co-founders of Poole punk/mod band Tours, singing and playing lead guitar. They signed to Virgin Records in 1979 after selling large quantities of their self-produced and distributed "Language School/Foreign Girls" double A side 7" single. BBC Radio 1 DJs John Peel and Mike Read championed the band which led to a bidding war between Virgin, Polydor, Sire and EMI records. Eventually the band signed to Virgin, but the association was short-lived after an argument between the band and the label led the other founder/leader Ronnie Mayor to quit.

Mazda formed a new band, The Cosmetics, and went on to become the in house producer of IRS Records, working with seminal punk/new wave acts such as The Fall, The Birthday Party, Wall of Voodoo, The Fleshtones, Tom Robinson (including playing guitar in his band), Alternative TV, Yello, Suburban Lawns, Brian James, The Scientists and The Folk Devils. He released a solo album, Hands of Fate, in 1983. Later, Mazda turned his attention back to his first musical love and began working with R&B musicians such as Average White Band, The JBs, Neneh Cherry, Bootsy Collins and Ultra Nate.

Songwriting

Mazda also pursued a parallel career as a songwriter. After signing to Warner Chappell Music in 1989 he went on to write, "How Long", a Billboard R&B No 1 hit for American singer Ultra Nate which won him a prestigious A.S.C.A.P award. As a writer he contributed to albums by Jamie J. Morgan, The JBs, Average White Band, Clyde "Funky Drummer" Stubblefield, Nick Kamen and many others.

Acting career

In January 2005 he formed his own acting troupe, "The Queens Players" and, a year after emigrating to the USA, he scored an Off Broadway role as 'English' in Scott Brooks' Bag Fulla Money which played at 42nd Street's Clurman Theatre. Mazda has appeared in various Hollywood films including Saving Private Ryan, Batman Begins, Love Actually and Quills.

Director

After several years in New York Mazda is now the owner of a custom built theatre complex, The Secret Theatre, which grew from the foundation of "The Queens Players", a classical acting troupe which was founded by Mazda in 2005. In 2007, after a search for a home for The Queens Players, The Secret Theatre was built in a warehouse building, The LIC Arts Center. The initial performance space is now known as The Little Secret after a second larger space The Big Secret was constructed in 2009. This was followed by a third space, POCO which opened in 2010 and then The Studio was built in 2012. The Secret Theatre is now the home of not only The Queens Players, but also acts as a rental house for prestigious off off companies such as Flux Theatre Ensemble and Gideon Productions. Notable productions includes the NYIT Award-winning HoneyComb Trilogy and Adam Szymkowicz's Hearts Like Fists.

LIC Arts Open

LIC Arts Open

Mazda founded the LIC Arts Open with sculptor/mosaicist, Karen Dimit, in 2011. Now in its fifth year Mazda is the Executive Director of the LIC Arts Open which produces the largest Art Festival in Queens. The festival has grown each year from its inception and in 2015 the festival encompassed more than 65 venues where over 500 artists either exhibited, opened their studios, performed or participated in this now 5-day festival in Long Island City.

References
Notes

Bibliography

External links
 
 Licartsopen.org

 Unofficial IRS Records site 

Living people
British record producers
British male stage actors
British songwriters
British male film actors
1955 births